Teofilo Kisanji University (TEKU) is a private university in Mbeya, Tanzania. It is run by the Moravian Church of Tanzania.

References

External links
 

Private universities in Tanzania
Universities in Mbeya
Educational institutions established in 2006
2006 establishments in Tanzania